The 2009-10 All American Hockey League season was the second season of the All American Hockey League. Seven teams participated in the regular season, and the Evansville IceMen were the league champions.

Regular season

Playoffs

External links
 Season 2009/10 on hockeydb.com

AAHL
2009-10